The 1st Danish Artillery Battalion is a part of Army Combat and Fire Support Center and was created after under the Danish Defence Agreement 2013-2017, after the Danish Artillery Regiment was disbanded. It is the only remaining military unit in the Danish Army that is involved with artillery, and is therefore the bearer of the traditions of the former regiment and can trace its roots back to 1684.

The battalion is divided into a number of batteries with around 500 personnel in total.

1 DAA provides fielding and training of the army's ability to plan, deploy, manage and operate fire-support such as howitzer and heavy mortars at different tactical levels.

1 January 2019, 1 DAA was merge back into the reactivated Danish Artillery Regiment as 1st Artillery Battalion (1AA).

See also
Royal Danish Army
Danish Artillery Regiment
Equipment of the Royal Danish Army
Military of Denmark

References

External links
 forsvaret.dk/HKIC - Hærens kamp- og ildstøttecenter
 artilleriet.dk

Artillery regiments of Denmark
Military units and formations established in 2014
2014 establishments in Denmark